Samuel Vyvyan Trerice Adams (22 April 1900 – 13 August 1951), known as Vyvyan Adams, was a British Conservative Party politician. He was the Member of Parliament (MP) for Leeds West from 1931 to 1945, when he was defeated by the swing to Labour. He stood unsuccessfully in the Fulham East constituency in 1950. He had been adopted for the safe Conservative seat of Darwen early in 1951, but died later that year.

His Times obituary was headed Intellectual Honesty and Independence. He was opposed to appeasement of Mussolini (in Abyssinia) and Hitler, and was one of the two Conservative MPs (with Duff Cooper) to oppose the Munich agreement with Hitler in 1938. He was opposed to the death penalty.

Personal life
He was educated at King's College School, Cambridge, Haileybury, and King's College, Cambridge (MA). He married in 1925 Mary Campin, who was later a television producer and programme director. He was a barrister, and was a Major in the Duke of Cornwall's Light Infantry of the British Army in World War II.

In 1951 he drowned while swimming at Gunwalloe Church Cove near Helston, Cornwall, a place noted for strong currents. Their daughter Sally, then 14, helped her mother but was unable to save her father.

Publications
He wrote several books, the first three under the pseudonym Watchman:
Right Honourable Gentlemen (1939) 
What of the Night? (1940) 
Churchill: Architect of Victory (1940) 
A Letter to a Young Politician (1946) 
The British Co-operative Movement (1948)

References and sources
References

Sources
 
Who Was Who (1951)  
The Times (London): 1951; Obituary, 15 August p. 6 & news item, 14 August p6.

1900 births
1951 deaths
People educated at Haileybury and Imperial Service College
Alumni of King's College, Cambridge
UK MPs 1931–1935
UK MPs 1935–1945
Conservative Party (UK) MPs for English constituencies
British Army personnel of World War II
Accidental deaths in England
Deaths by drowning in the United Kingdom
Duke of Cornwall's Light Infantry officers